Jo Horny (born 3 September 1938) is a Belgian boxer. He competed in the men's flyweight event at the 1960 Summer Olympics.

References

1938 births
Living people
Belgian male boxers
Olympic boxers of Belgium
Boxers at the 1960 Summer Olympics
Sportspeople from Brussels
Flyweight boxers